Léon Roches (September 27, 1809, Grenoble – 1901) was a representative of the French government in Japan from 1864 to 1868.

Léon Roches was a student at the Lycée de Tournon in Grenoble, and followed an education in Law. After only 6 months at university, he quit to assist friends of his father as a trader in Marseilles.

North Africa
When Léon's father acquired a plantation in Algeria, Léon left France to join him on June 30, 1832. Léon spent the next 32 years on the African continent. He learned the Arab language very rapidly and after only two years was recruited as translator for the French Army in Africa. He served as an Officer (Sous-Lieutenant) of cavalry in the Garde Nationale d'Algerie from 1835 to 1839. General Bugeaud asked him to negotiate with Abd-el-Kader in order to bring about the cessation of hostilities against the French. He is noted as having been highly respected by Arab chieftains.

Under Bugeaud's recommendation, Roches joined the French Foreign Ministry as an interpreter in 1845. In 1846 he became Secretary of the legation in Tangier, and then took responsibilities at the French mission in Morocco.

From 1855 to 1863, Roches served as the French consul general in Tunis, Tunisia.

Using his experiences in North Africa, he wrote a book titled Trente-deux ans à travers l′Islam (Thirty-two years through Islam).

Trieste
By an exceptional nomination, Roches became first-class Consul in Trieste, allowing him to acquire a strong experience in trading matters. After three years, he was appointed Consul in Tripoli. In 1855, he became Consul in Tunis. He often wore Arab dress and was renowned for his abilities with guns and horses.

Japan

On October 7, 1863, Roches was nominated Consul General of France in Edo, Japan, and remained in that position until February 1868. His great rival was the British consul Harry Parkes. The French government took the side of the Tokugawa Bakufu and thus was not very popular in Japan after the Meiji Restoration. On March 23, 1868, Roches and the Dutch Minister-Resident Dirk de Graeff van Polsbroek were the first European envoys ever to receive a personal audience with the new Emperor Meiji in Edo (Tokyo). 

Roches advocated the use of strength against the anti-foreign adversaries of the Shogunate. He fully supported the 1864 allied Bombardment of Shimonoseki.

Roches also helped the Shogunate modernize. He arranged for an "Ecole Franco-Japonaise" to be established, and organized the building of the Yokosuka arsenal. In 1866, he wrote to the French Minister Drouyn de Lhuys:

He left Japan on June 23, 1868, following the defeat of the Shogun's forces in the battle of Toba-Fushimi.

Notes

References
 Medzini, Meron French Policy in Japan Harvard University Press 1971,

See also
Franco-Japanese relations

1809 births
1901 deaths
People from Grenoble
Ambassadors of France to Japan
19th-century French diplomats